Maude is an American sitcom television series that was originally broadcast on the CBS network from September 12, 1972, until April 22, 1978.

Maude stars Bea Arthur as Maude Findlay, an outspoken, middle-aged, politically liberal woman living in suburban Tuckahoe, New York with her fourth husband, household appliance store owner Walter Findlay (Bill Macy). Maude embraces the tenets of women's liberation, always votes for Democratic Party candidates, and advocates for civil rights and racial and gender equality. However, her overbearing and sometimes domineering personality often gets her into trouble when speaking about these issues.

The show was the first spin-off of All in the Family, on which Arthur had made two appearances as Maude, Edith Bunker's favorite cousin. Like All in the Family, Maude was a sitcom with topical storylines created by producers Norman Lear and Bud Yorkin.

Unusual for an American sitcom, several episodes (such as "Maude's Night Out" and "The Convention") featured only the characters of Maude and her husband Walter, in what amounted to half-hour "two-hander" teleplays. In the season four episode "The Analyst" (sometimes referred to as "Maude Bares Her Soul"), Arthur as Maude, speaking to an unseen psychiatrist, was the sole actor on screen for the entire episode.

The show's theme song, "And Then There's Maude", was written by Alan and Marilyn Bergman and Dave Grusin, and performed by Donny Hathaway.

Characters 

Maude first appears in two season-two episodes of All in the Family: the first in December 1971 as a visitor to the Bunker home, and the second, a backdoor pilot setting up the premise of the Maude series, in March 1972. She is Edith Bunker's (Jean Stapleton) favorite cousin who has been married four times. Her first husband, Barney, died shortly after their marriage; she divorced the next two, Albert and Chester. Albert was never portrayed on screen, but the episode "Poor Albert" revolved around his death, while second former husband Chester would appear once on the show (played by Martin Balsam). Her fourth (and current) husband, Walter Findlay (played by Bill Macy), owns an appliance store called Findlay's Friendly Appliances. Maude and Walter met just before the 1968 presidential election. Maude sometimes gets in the last word during their many arguments with her hallmark catchphrase, "God'll get you for that, Walter", which came directly from Bea Arthur. Maude's deep, raspy voice is also an occasional comic foil whenever she answers the phone and explaining in one episode, "No, this is not Mr. Findlay; this is Mrs. Findlay! Mr. Findlay has a much higher voice."

Maude's daughter, Carol Traynor (played by Adrienne Barbeau – in the All in the Family pilot episode the character was played by Marcia Rodd), is also divorced and has one child, like Maude. Carol and her son, Phillip (played by Brian Morrison in seasons 1-5 and by Kraig Metzinger in the sixth), live with the Findlays. Though single, Carol maintains her reputation of dating many men. She dates various men throughout the early seasons, later forming a serious relationship with a man named Chris (played by Fred Grandy); Grandy left at the end of the second season. Like her mother, Carol is an outspoken liberal feminist who is not afraid to speak her mind, though they often clash. There are conflicting accounts as to whether Carol's father was Maude's first or second husband. In the series' first episode, "Maude's Problem", Maude reveals to Carol's psychiatrist that Carol's father was her second husband.

The Findlays' next-door neighbors are Dr. Arthur Harmon (Conrad Bain), a stuffy, sardonic Republican, and his sweet but scatterbrained second wife Vivian (Rue McClanahan). McClanahan confirmed in an interview with the Archive of American Television that she was approached by Norman Lear during the taping of the All in the Family episode "The Bunkers and the Swingers" (1972) to take on the role as a late replacement for Doris Roberts, the original choice for the part. Arthur has been Walter's best friend since the two served together in World War II; he was the one who brought Walter and Maude together in 1968 and "affectionately" calls Maude "Maudie." Vivian and Maude have been best friends since college. At the beginning of the series, Arthur is a widower. Vivian is introduced in a guest appearance that focused on her split with her first husband. She later got involved with Arthur as a divorcée.

The housekeepers 

For the entire run of the show, Maude also has a housekeeper. At the beginning of the series, Maude hires Florida Evans (Esther Rolle), a no-nonsense black woman who often has the last laugh at Maude's expense. Maude often makes a point of conspicuously and awkwardly demonstrating how open-minded and liberal she is (Florida almost quits because of this). Despite Florida's status as a maid, Maude emphasizes to Florida that they are "equals," and insists she enter and exit the house via the front door, even though the back door is more convenient for Florida.

Rolle's character was so popular that, in 1974, she became the star of her own series, Good Times. In the second-season episode titled "Florida's Goodbye", Florida's husband Henry (John Amos) gets a promotion at his job, and Florida quits to become a full-time housewife. Whereas Maude took place in New York, Good Times took place in Chicago, with numerous other differences in Florida's situation, such as her husband being called James Evans – "Henry" being the name of James's long-lost father.

After Florida's departure in 1974, Maude hires Mrs. Nell Naugatuck (Hermione Baddeley), an elderly (and vulgar) British widow who drinks excessively and lies compulsively, as her new housekeeper. Unlike Florida, who commuted to work, Mrs. Naugatuck lives with the Findlays. She meets and begins dating Bert Beasley (J. Pat O'Malley), a graveyard security guard, in 1975. They get married in 1977 and move to Ireland to care for Bert's mother. Mrs. Naugatuck's frequent sparring with Maude is, arguably, just as comically popular as Florida's sparring. The difference, however, is that Mrs. Naugatuck often seems to despise Maude, whereas Florida is only periodically frustrated by Maude.

Lear said the last name "Naugatuck" was taken directly from the town of Naugatuck, Connecticut, which he found amusing. Due to the popularity of Maude, Baddeley visited the town in the late 1970s and was given a warm, official ceremony at the town green.

Maude then hires Victoria Butterfield (Marlene Warfield), a native of Saint Norman in the West Indies, whom Maude initially accuses of stealing her wallet on the subway. Victoria remains until the end of the series in 1978. However, Warfield's character was never as popular as her two predecessors, and she was not seen as often, nor given a credit as a series regular.

Series history, topicality, and controversy 

The character of Maude Findlay was loosely based on creator Norman Lear's then-wife Frances. She first appeared on two episodes of All in the Family as Edith Bunker's cousin. A "Cousin Maud," with a similar role, had also appeared on an episode of Till Death Us Do Part, the British series on which All in the Family had been based. Maude represented everything Archie Bunker did not: she was a liberal, feminist, upper-middle-class Democrat, whereas Archie was a conservative, prejudiced, working-class Republican.

Maude's political beliefs were closer to those of the series creators than Archie Bunker's, but the series often lampooned Maude as a naive "limousine liberal". They did not show her beliefs and attitudes in an entirely complimentary light. Just before the show's premiere in September 1972, TV Guide described the character of Maude as "a caricature of the knee-jerk liberal."

While the show was conceived as a comedy, scripts also incorporated much darker humor, drama and controversy. Maude took Miltown, a mild tranquilizer, and also Valium; she and her husband Walter began drinking in the evening. Maude had an abortion in November 1972, two months before the Roe v. Wade decision made abortion legal throughout the U.S., and the episodes that dealt with the situation are probably the series' most famous and most controversial. Maude, at age 47, was dismayed to find herself unexpectedly pregnant. Her daughter Carol brought to her attention that abortion had become legal in the state of New York. After some soul-searching (and discussions with Walter, who agreed that raising a baby at their stage of life was not what they wanted to do), Maude decided at the end of the two-part episode that abortion was probably the best choice for their lives and their marriage. Noticing the controversy around the storyline, CBS decided to rerun the episodes in August 1973, and members of the country's clergy reacted strongly to the decision. Thirty-nine stations pre-empted the episode. The two-part episode was written by Susan Harris, who would work with Bea Arthur again later on The Golden Girls.

The producers and the writers of the show tackled other controversies. In a story arc that opened the 1973–74 season, Walter came to grips with his alcoholism and subsequently had a nervous breakdown. The beginning of the story arc had Maude, Walter, and Arthur enjoying a night of revelry. However, Maude panicked when she awoke the following morning to find Arthur in her bed. This alarmed her to the point that both of them swore off alcohol entirely. Walter could not do it ("Dean Martin gets a million dollars for his buzz") and became so frustrated during his attempts to stop that he struck Maude. Afterward, he suffered a breakdown as a result of his alcoholism and guilt over the domestic violence incident. The arc, which played out in two parts, was typically controversial for the show but gained praise for highlighting how social drinking can lead to alcoholism.

The first-season episode "The Grass Story" tackled the then-recent Rockefeller Drug Laws, as Maude and her well-meaning housewife friends try to get arrested in protest over a grocery boy's tough conviction for marijuana possession. The severity of the marijuana laws contrasted with the characters' lax attitudes toward drinking and prescription pill abuse.

In season four, Maude had a session with an analyst, in which she revealed insecurities about her life and marriage and talked through memories from her childhood. The episode was a solo performance by Beatrice Arthur.

During the fifth season, Walter suffered another nervous breakdown, this time even attempting suicide, when he saw his business go bankrupt.

The Nielsen ratings for Maude were high, in particular, during the first seasons of the program (during the heyday of topical sitcoms, which its presence helped to create), when it was regularly one of the top-ten highest-rated American television programs in any given week.

In Great Britain, Maude was not shown nationally, although it was shown (beginning in 1975) in the ITV regions of Scottish, Westward, Border, Tyne Tees, Anglia, Yorkshire, Granada and Channel. Satellite station Sky One ran the series in the early/mid-1990s.

Series ending 

In the fifth season, Maude declined from No. 4 to No. 31 in the Nielsen ratings as its lead-ins Rhoda and Phyllis began to struggle. In 1978, late in the sixth season, CBS, in an attempt to save the series, revamped the format. In the last three episodes of that year, the fictional governor of New York appointed Maude as a congresswoman from Tuckahoe, as a Democrat during the 1978 U.S. midterm elections (she helped campaign for a congresswoman who unexpectedly died in her home). With this change, Maude and husband Walter would move to Washington, D.C., and the rest of the regular cast would be written out of the series.

However, with the show already having lost substantial viewership and faltering with low ratings, Bea Arthur felt that it didn't make sense to "start all over again" with a new group of supporting characters. As a result, Arthur made the decision to leave the series after season six, bringing Maude to an end. Lear still liked the idea of a member of a minority group in Congress, and it evolved into the pilot Mr. Dugan, with John Amos replacing Arthur as the lead character. Intended for a March 1979 premiere, a negative backlash from a screening for African-American members of Congress resulted in CBS pulling the plug and not airing any of the three episodes produced. Lear went back to work on the project and it was eventually reworked into Hanging In, with Bill Macy returning to play a former professional football player turned university president. Premiering in the summer of 1979, the show did not find an audience and ended shortly after it began.

Episodes

Home media
Sony Pictures Home Entertainment released the first season of Maude on DVD in Region 1 on March 20, 2007.

On August 27, 2013, Mill Creek Entertainment announced it had acquired the rights to various television series from the Sony Pictures library including Maude. Mill Creek subsequently re-released the first season on DVD on February 3, 2015.

On December 2, 2014, Shout! Factory announced it had acquired the rights to the series; it subsequently released the complete series on DVD on March 17, 2015. Among the bonus features, the set includes the two Second season episodes of All in the Family, which introduced Maude ("Cousin Maude's Visit" and "Maude"); two previously unaired episodes of Maude ("The Double Standard" and "Maude's New Friends"); the Syndicated Sales Presentation, hosted by Norman Lear; as well as three featurettes called "And Then There's Maude: Television's First Feminist"; "Everything but Hemorrhoids: Maude Speaks to America"; and "Memories of Maude" with interviews by Adrienne Barbeau and Bill Macy, along with newly discovered interviews with Bea Arthur, Rue McClanahan and Maude director, Hal Cooper.

In 2015, Shout! began releasing individual season sets; the second season was released on August 11, 2015, followed by the third season on November 10, 2015, the fourth season on March 22, 2016, the fifth season on June 14, 2016, and the sixth and final season on August 9, 2016.

Awards and nominations

Golden Globes
 1973: Best TV Show - Musical/Comedy (Nominated)
 1973: Best TV Actress - Musical/Comedy: Bea Arthur  (Nominated)
 1974: Best TV Actress - Musical/Comedy: Bea Arthur (Nominated)
 1975: Best TV Show - Musical/Comedy (Nominated)
 1976: Best TV Actress - Musical/Comedy: Bea Arthur (Nominated)
 1976: Best Supporting Actress - Television: Hermione Baddeley For playing "Mrs. Nell Naugatuck" (Won)
 1977: Best Supporting Actress - Television: Adrienne Barbeau (Nominated)
 1978: Best TV Actress - Musical/Comedy: Bea Arthur  (Nominated)

Emmy Awards
 1973: Outstanding Continued Performance by an Actress in a Leading Role in a Comedy Series - Bea Arthur For playing: "Maude Findlay" (Nominated)
 1973: Outstanding New Series - Norman Lear (executive producer) and Rod Parker (producer) (Nominated)
 1973: Outstanding Comedy Series - Norman Lear (executive producer) and Rod Parker (Nominated)
 1974: Outstanding Lead Actress in a Comedy Series - Bea Arthur For playing: "Maude Findlay" (Nominated)
 1976: Outstanding Writing in a Comedy Series - Jay Folb For episode "The Analyst" (Nominated)
 1976: Outstanding Directing in a Comedy Series - Hal Cooper For episode "The Analyst" (Nominated)
 1976: Outstanding Lead Actress in a Comedy Series - Bea Arthur For playing: "Maude Findlay" (Nominated)
 1977: Outstanding Lead Actress in a Comedy Series - Bea Arthur For playing: "Maude Findlay" (Won)
 1977: Outstanding Art Direction or Scenic Design for a Comedy Series - Chuck Murawski (art director) For episode "Walter's Crisis" (Nominated)
 1978: Outstanding Art Direction for a Comedy Series - Chuck Murawski (art director) For episode "The Wake (Nominated)
 1978: Outstanding Directing in a Comedy Series - Hal Cooper (director) For episode "Vivian's Decision" (Nominated)
 1978: Outstanding Lead Actress in a Comedy Series - Bea Arthur For playing: "Maude Findlay" (Nominated)

Syndication and streaming 

Maude aired on TV Land in 1999 for a brief time, including an introductory "Maude-a-thon" marathon. Maude was later seen on Nick at Nite in the United States in 2001. Reruns of Maude are occasionally shown on Canwest's digital specialty channel, DejaView in Canada. In 2010, Maude began reruns in Chicago, on WWME-CA's Me-TV. In 2011, Maude began airing on Antenna TV, a digital broadcast network, which has since run the entire six season cycle of the show. In 2015, reruns of Maude began airing on Logo TV during late night/early morning. It also airs weeknights on FETV (Family Entertainment Television). As of April 2021, Maude is on CHCH TV in the Toronto (Hamilton) Ontario area as part of their afternoon retro sitcom lineup. It is also available in a heavily edited format on the CTV app for free (with ads) as part of its “Throwback” library.

As of July 2021, Maude is available for streaming on IMDb TV, now Amazon Freevee.

Adaptations 
Maude was adapted  in Italy airing on Canale 5 in 1982.

Maguy aired on Sundays at 19.30 from September 1985 to December 1994 on France 2 for 333 episodes.

Maude had previously been adapted in 1980 by ITV in the United Kingdom as Nobody's Perfect. Starring Elaine Stritch and Richard Griffiths, the show ran for two series with a total of 14 episodes. Of the 14 episodes, Stritch herself adapted 13 original Maude scripts and Griffiths adapted one.  The original series was screened by certain ITV companies.

References

External links 

 
 Information about Maude from the Museum of Broadcast Communications
 Information of Season 1's release on DVD
 

All in the Family
1972 American television series debuts
1978 American television series endings
1970s American sitcoms
CBS original programming
American television spin-offs
English-language television shows
Television series by Sony Pictures Television
Television shows filmed in Los Angeles
Television shows set in New York (state)
Television series created by Norman Lear
Television controversies in the United States